The Hungarian International in badminton is an international open held in Hungary since 1974. In the first years it was held every two years, and since 1978 it is held annually. The competition is typically held in autumn, and it belongs to the EBU Circuit. The Hungarian National Badminton Championships started in 1960.

Previous winners

Performances by nation

References

External links
Official website 

Badminton tournaments
Badminton tournaments in Hungary
Sports competitions in Hungary
Recurring sporting events established in 1974